Hilary Mary Weston  ( Frayne; born January 12, 1942) is an Irish–Canadian businesswoman and writer who served as the 26th Lieutenant Governor of Ontario from 1997 to 2002. During her five-year tenure, Weston focused on issues related to women, volunteerism and young people, drawing public attention to people working with the homeless, in hospices and as mentors to at-risk youth.

Life and career
Born and raised in Dublin, Ireland, she worked as a model before marrying Galen Weston in 1966. They moved to Toronto in 1974, and she became a Canadian citizen. They have two married children, Alannah and Galen Jr., and five grandchildren – two girls and a boy with Alannah and her husband Alex Cochrane (an interior architect), and two boys with Galen and his wife Alexandra.

Prior to her appointment as Lieutenant Governor, Weston spent over two decades working in business and the fashion industry. As deputy chair of Holt Renfrew, she promoted Canadian design and merchandise. During the same period, she also served as a director of Brown Thomas & Co. in Ireland, co-founded Torwest in the United States, and served as vice-chair and design director of the Windsor Club at the Windsor gated community in Vero Beach, Florida.

In 1979, Weston founded the Ireland Fund of Canada, a non-partisan, non-denominational organization that funds community projects in Ireland to promote peace. She continues to serve as an honorary patron of the organization.

An interest in early childhood education led Weston to serve as founding chair of the Mabin School in Toronto. She also co-founded and chaired the Canadian Environment Educational Foundation, and she established the Winter Garden Show at the Royal Agricultural Winter Fair. Weston has explored her longstanding interest in homes and gardens as co-author of two best-selling books, In a Canadian Garden (1989) and At Home in Canada (1995).

After her term as Lieutenant Governor, Weston spearheaded the most successful fundraising campaign in Canadian cultural history, which raised more than $250 million for the Royal Ontario Museum. She is patron of several organizations dealing with social issues, such as the Abbeyfield House Society, the Hospice Association of Ontario, the Landmine Survivors Network (later known as Survivor Corps), the Ontario March of Dimes, the Prince's Trust Canada and the Yonge Street Mission. Weston also devotes a significant proportion of her time, as well as her business and fashion expertise, to Selfridges, the London department store of which she is a director.

Honours
As Lieutenant Governor of Ontario, Weston received the Order of Ontario in 1997, and she served as chancellor of the order during her term in office. She was also invested as a Dame of Justice in the Venerable Order of St. John in 1997. Weston was appointed as a Member of the Order of Canada in 2003. She received the Canadian version of the Queen Elizabeth II Golden Jubilee Medal in 2002 and the Canadian version of the Queen Elizabeth II Diamond Jubilee Medal in 2012. In the 2015 Birthday Honours, she was made a Commander of the Royal Victorian Order.

Ten post-secondary institutions have recognized Weston with honorary degrees, including the University of Western Ontario, University of St. Michael's College, University of Toronto, Massey College, Trinity College, Dublin and University College Dublin

In 2009, Weston received the President's Award at the YWCA Toronto Women of Distinction Awards, for modeling leadership in public and private life.

Ribbon bars

Arms

References

External links
 

1942 births
20th-century Irish people
21st-century Irish people
People from Sandymount
Living people
Lieutenant Governors of Ontario
Members of the Order of Canada
Irish emigrants to Canada
Hilary
Canadian billionaires
Canadian philanthropists
Irish billionaires
Canadian non-fiction writers
Canadian women non-fiction writers
Canadian women in business
Businesspeople from Ontario
Irish expatriates in Canada
Women in Ontario politics
Canadian women viceroys
Canadian Commanders of the Royal Victorian Order